Achille Leonardi (ca. 1800–1870) was an Italian artist.  Leonardi painted with oil on canvas.

Works
A representative sample of Leonardi's works include:
 Linda di Chamonnid (Chamonix) (100 x 75 cm)
 A child's bed time (98 x 74 cm)
 Hurrying Home (46 x 38 cm)
 Guido Reni painting the Portrait of Beatrice Cenci in prison
 Madonna and Child (85 x 101.5 cm)
 Young Girl in Cloister - (99.1 x 71.1 cm)
 La Condamnée à Mort

A number of Leonardi's works were reproduced in different sizes. For example, 'Linda di Chamonnid' can also be seen at the Sheraton Towers Hotel in Buenos Aires sized about 150% larger than the one listed above, which is now in a private collection in New Zealand.  Similarly, there are at least two versions of 'Portrait of Beatrice' and 'Hurrying Home' in different sizes.

See also
 List of Italian painters

External links
 Link to further information

1870 deaths
19th-century Italian painters
Italian male painters
Italian genre painters
Year of birth uncertain
Year of birth unknown
19th-century Italian male artists